Ernst Kraft Wilhelm Nußelt (Nusselt in English; born November 25, 1882 in Nuremberg – died September 1, 1957 in München) was a German engineer. Nusselt studied mechanical engineering at the Munich Technical University (Technische Universität München), where he got his doctorate in 1907. He taught in Dresden from 1913 to 1917.

During this teaching tenure he developed the dimensional analysis of heat transfer, without any knowledge of the Buckingham π theorem or any other developments of Lord Rayleigh.

In so doing he opened the door for further heat transfer analysis. After teaching and working in Switzerland and Germany between 1917 and 1925, he was appointed to the Chair of Theoretical Mechanics in München. There he made important developments in the field of heat exchangers. He held that position until 1952, being succeeded in the job by another important figure in the field of heat transfer, Ernst Schmidt.

The Nusselt number used in Fluid Mechanics and Heat Transfer is named in his honour.

References

Encyclopedia.com

1882 births
1957 deaths
Engineers from Nuremberg
People from the Kingdom of Bavaria
Technical University of Berlin alumni
Technical University of Munich alumni
Academic staff of the Technical University of Munich
Academic staff of the Karlsruhe Institute of Technology
German mechanical engineers
Fluid dynamicists